Montgomery Cunningham Meigs (January 11, 1945 – July 6, 2021) was a United States Army general. He was named for his great-great-great-granduncle, Quartermaster General Montgomery C. Meigs, the father of Arlington National Cemetery, and for his father Lieutenant Colonel Montgomery Meigs, a World War II tank commander who was killed in action one month before Meigs was born.

Early life and education
Meigs graduated from the Holderness School in Holderness, New Hampshire, in 1963 and went on to United States Military Academy at West Point, New York, where he graduated in 1967. He served as a cavalry troop commander in the Vietnam War with the 9th Infantry Division. After study at the University of Wisconsin–Madison and a year at the Army's Command and General Staff College, he taught in the History Department at West Point and spent the 1981–82 academic year at Massachusetts Institute of Technology as an International Affairs Fellow of the Council on Foreign Relations.

Military career

Meigs received his PhD in history from Wisconsin in 1982 before reporting to 2nd Armored Cavalry Regiment as its executive officer. In 1984, Meigs commanded the 1st Squadron, 1st Armored Cavalry Regiment. Following a stint at the National War College as an Army Fellow, he worked as a strategic planner on the Joint Staff in Washington, D.C. for three years. Returning to Germany, he assumed command of the 2nd Brigade, 1st Armored Division on September 26, 1990, and commanded it through Operation Desert Storm. He subsequently commanded the 7th Army Training Command in Grafenwoehr and served as Chief of Staff of V Corps and Deputy Chief of Staff for Operations of the United States Army, Europe, and 7th Army. Meigs commanded the 3rd Infantry Division from July 1995 until its reflagging as the 1st Infantry Division in February 1996. In October, he deployed with the 1st Infantry Division to Bosnia, serving nine months in command of NATO's Multi-National Division (North) in Operations Joint Endeavor and Joint Guard.

Meigs commanded the NATO Stabilisation Force in Bosnia and Herzegovina from October 23, 1998, to October 1999, concurrent with his command of United States Army Europe/7th Army.

Meigs was the commander-in-chief of the United States Army Europe and Africa until his retirement in 2002.

Post-military career
After Meigs left active military service, he was a professor at the Maxwell School at Syracuse University and served as a military consultant to The Pentagon. In 2008 he returned to NBC News as a military consultant.

In December 2007, Meigs left his previous position as the director of the United States Department of Defense's Joint Improvised Explosive Device Defeat Organization (JIEDDO). He was a Visiting Professor of Strategy and Military Operations at Georgetown University's School of Foreign Service and held positions at Mitre Corporation, International Executive Service Corps, and the LBJ School of Public Affairs at The University of Texas at Austin. 

From January 1, 2010, to July 25, 2013, Meigs served as president and chief executive officer of Business Executives for National Security (BENS), a nonprofit composed of senior business executives who volunteer to help address national security challenges.

He died on July 6, 2021, in Austin, Texas.

Awards and decorations
Meigs' awards include the Army Distinguished Service Medal, the Legion of Merit with oak leaf cluster, the Bronze Star Medal with "V" device, and the Purple Heart.

Author
 
 University Press of the Pacific (2002)

References

External links
Biography from nato.int
Official U.S. Army bio
Official Joint Improvised Explosive Device Defeat Organization web site
Meigs Family papers  at Hagley Museum and Library The collection contains the personal papers of many of his predecessors.

1945 births
2021 deaths
United States Army personnel of the Vietnam War
Commandants of the United States Army Command and General Staff College
Walsh School of Foreign Service faculty
Recipients of the Distinguished Service Medal (US Army)
Knights Commander of the Order of Merit of the Federal Republic of Germany
Syracuse University faculty
United States Army generals
Holderness School alumni
United States Military Academy alumni
University of Wisconsin–Madison alumni
United States Army personnel of the Gulf War
People from Annapolis, Maryland